Bossiaea vombata, commonly known as wombat bossiaea, is a species of flowering plant in the family Fabaceae and is endemic to the Wombat State Forest in Victoria, Australia. It is an erect shrub with flattened cladodes and yellow, pea-like flowers.

Description
Flowering occurs in October and fruit is rarely produced.

Taxonomy
Bossiaea vombata was first formally described in 2008 by James Henderson Ross in the journal Muelleria from specimens he collected in the Wombat State Forest in 1995. The specific epithet (vombata) refers to the name of the state forest where this species is endemic.

Distribution and habitat
Wombat bossiaea is only known from the Wombat State Forest near Daylesford where it grows in open forest.

Conservation status
This bossiaea is classified as "endangered" under the Victorian Government Flora and Fauna Guarantee Act 1988.

References

Mirbelioids
Flora of Victoria (Australia)
Plants described in 2008